Ross Wright (born 28 September 1952) is a former Australian rules footballer who played with Essendon in the Victorian Football League (VFL). He won Essendon's under-19s best and fairest in 1971. Wright later played for Hobart in the Tasmanian Football League from 1975 to 1977, coming runner-up in the league best and fairest in 1976. He then spent five season with Camberwell in the Victorian Football Association (VFA), winning premierships in 1979 and 1981. At a representative level, Wright played for Tasmania in 1976 and the VFA from 1979–81. He finished his career playing for his old side East Ringwood.

Notes

External links 		
		

Essendon Football Club past player profile
		
		
		

Living people
1952 births
Australian rules footballers from Victoria (Australia)		
Essendon Football Club players
Hobart Football Club players
Camberwell Football Club players